
Anatol Roshko (15 July 1923 – 23 January 2017) was a Canadian-born physicist and engineer. He was the Theodore von Kármán Professor of Aeronautics, Emeritus, at the California Institute of Technology, Pasadena, CA.

Roshko is known for his contributions to gas dynamics. He along with H. W. Liepmann is the co-author of the widely used textbook "Elements of Gasdynamics". He has made research contributions to problems of separated flow; bluff-body aerodynamics; structure of turbulent shear flow.

He completed his undergraduate education at the University of Alberta with a B.Sc. degree in Engineering Physics, in 1945, received the M.Sc. degree from Caltech in 1947 and the Ph.D. in 1952. Most of his academic career has been at Caltech, where he was the Theodore von Karman Professor of Aeronautics, Emeritus at the time of his death. He was also a member of the National Academy of Engineering; a Fellow of the American Institute of Aeronautics and Astronautics, the American Physical Society, the American Academy of Arts and Sciences and an Honorary Fellow of the Indian Academy of Sciences. Roshko received Fluid Dynamics Prize by the American Physical Society (APS) in 1987.  He was also awarded the Timoshenko Medal in 1999.

Books

See also
Roshko number
Turbulence
Turbulent flow
Vortex

References

External links
Biography Prof. Anatol Roshko.

1923 births
2017 deaths
American aerospace engineers
Engineering educators
University of Alberta alumni
California Institute of Technology alumni
California Institute of Technology faculty
Fluid dynamicists
Aerodynamicists
Fellows of the Indian Academy of Sciences
Members of the United States National Academy of Sciences
Members of the United States National Academy of Engineering
Fellows of the American Physical Society
Canadian emigrants to the United States